Thor Erdahl (born 22 May 1951) is a Norwegian painter from Kabelvåg in Lofoten. He owns a gallery in Kabelvåg, called . Erdahl is also the designer of Kabelvåg Torg.

References

External links 
Storslagen undervannskunst (NRK)  
Lofoten-kunstner stiller ut under vann (VG Nett) 

Living people
20th-century Norwegian painters
21st-century Norwegian painters
Norwegian male painters
1951 births
20th-century Norwegian male artists
21st-century Norwegian male artists